Wayman Lawrence Tisdale (June 9, 1964 – May 15, 2009) was an American professional basketball player in the National Basketball Association (NBA) and a smooth jazz bass guitarist. A three-time All American at the University of Oklahoma, he was elected to the National Collegiate Basketball Hall of Fame in 2009.

Early life
Tisdale was born in Fort Worth, Texas. His father, Louis Tisdale, was a well-known pastor in Tulsa, Oklahoma, serving for 21 years as senior pastor of Friendship Church; After his father died in 1997, the former Osage Expressway in Tulsa was named L.L. Tisdale Parkway in his honor. Wayman's older brother Weldon served as the church's pastor 1997–2018.

Growing up, Tisdale was not interested in basketball. When older brothers Weldon and William played pickup games he usually quit before they finished, retreating to the family's sandbox. However, Tisdale began taking to the sport in the eighth grade when he first learned to dunk.

He met his future wife Regina in April 1981 at church. They were juniors at different Tulsa high schools, and she did not know he was one of the most heavily recruited basketball players in the country.

Tisdale called music his "first love." Throughout his youth, and continuing through his college basketball career, he played bass guitar at his father's church.

Music and church were so important to Tisdale that after recruiting him to the University of Oklahoma, Sooners head coach Billy Tubbs changed the team's practice schedule. He moved the team's Sunday practice from the morning to the evening to allow Tisdale to play at morning services in his father's church in Tulsa.

Basketball career

Tisdale graduated from Booker T. Washington High School in Tulsa, Oklahoma, where he grew up. As a college player at the University of Oklahoma from 1982 to 1985, he was a three-time Big Eight Conference Player of the Year and the first player in collegiate history to be named a first-team All American by the Associated Press in his freshman, sophomore, and junior seasons. He still holds the record at Oklahoma for the most points scored by any player through his freshman and sophomore seasons. He won a gold medal as a member of the 1984 U.S. Olympic basketball team coached by Indiana University's Bobby Knight. The Indiana Pacers made Tisdale the second overall pick in the 1985 NBA draft.

As a power forward, Tisdale averaged over 15 points and six rebounds per game in a 12-season professional career with the Indiana Pacers, Sacramento Kings, and Phoenix Suns. His best season was in 1989–90 with the Kings, when he averaged 22.3 points and 7.5 rebounds a game. Tisdale retired in 1997 to focus on his musical career.

Tisdale's jersey number (23) was retired by the University of Oklahoma in 1997. When Blake Griffin was granted permission to wear it during his career at OU (2007–2009), he sought and received Tisdale's blessing before accepting it.

The outstanding freshman award in the NCAA is named the Wayman Tisdale Award.

NBA career statistics

Regular season 

|-
| style="text-align:left;"|
| style="text-align:left;"|Indiana
| 81 || 60 || 28.1 || .515 || .000 || .646 || 7.2 || 1.0 || .4 || .5 || 14.7
|-
| style="text-align:left;"|
| style="text-align:left;"|Indiana
| 81 || 15 || 26.7 || .513 || .000 || .709 || 5.9 || 1.4 || .6 || .3 || 14.5
|-
| style="text-align:left;"|
| style="text-align:left;"|Indiana
| 79 || 57 || 30.1 || .512 || .000 || .783 || 6.2 || 1.3 || .7 || .4 || 16.1
|-
| style="text-align:left;"|
| style="text-align:left;"|Indiana
| 48 || 5 || 27.6 || .505 || .000 || .792 || 6.5 || 1.6 || .7 || .7 || 16.0
|-
| style="text-align:left;"|
| style="text-align:left;"|Sacramento
| 31 || 30 || 35.7 || .523 ||  || .744 || 9.6 || 1.7 || .6 || .6 || 19.8
|-
| style="text-align:left;"|
| style="text-align:left;"|Sacramento
| 79 || 79 || 37.2 || .525 || .000 || .783 || 7.5 || 1.4 || .7 || .7 || 22.3
|-
| style="text-align:left;"|
| style="text-align:left;"|Sacramento
| 33 || 31 || 33.8 || .483 || .000 || .800 || 7.7 || 2.0 || .7 || .8 || 20.0
|-
| style="text-align:left;"|
| style="text-align:left;"|Sacramento
| 72 || 71 || 35.0 || .500 || .000 || .763 || 6.5 || 1.5 || .8 || 1.1 || 16.6
|-
| style="text-align:left;"|
| style="text-align:left;"|Sacramento
| 76 || 75 || 30.0 || .509 || .000 || .758 || 6.6 || 1.4 || .7 || .6 || 16.6
|-
| style="text-align:left;"|
| style="text-align:left;"|Sacramento
| 79 || 77 || 32.4 || .501 ||  || .808 || 7.1 || 1.8 || .5 || .7 || 16.7
|-
| style="text-align:left;"|
| style="text-align:left;"|Phoenix
| 65 || 13 || 19.6 || .484 ||  || .770 || 3.8 || .7 || .4 || .4 || 10.0
|-
| style="text-align:left;"|
| style="text-align:left;"|Phoenix
| 63 || 6 || 18.3 || .495 ||  || .765 || 3.4 || .9 || .2 || .6 || 10.7
|-
| style="text-align:left;"|
| style="text-align:left;"|Phoenix
| 53 || 15 || 14.7 || .426 ||  || .625 || 2.3 || .4 || .2 || .4 || 6.5
|- class="sortbottom"
| style="text-align:center;" colspan="2"|Career
| 840 || 534 || 28.4 || .505 || .000 || .760 || 6.1 || 1.3 || .6 || .6 || 15.3

Playoffs 

|-
| style="text-align:left;"|1987
| style="text-align:left;"|Indiana
| 4 || 0 || 27.0 || .613 ||  || .565 || 4.0 || 2.3 || .3 || .0 || 12.8
|-
| style="text-align:left;"|1995
| style="text-align:left;"|Phoenix
| 10 || 0 || 17.0 || .451 || .000 || .643 || 3.0 || 1.1 || .0 || .4 || 7.3
|-
| style="text-align:left;"|1996
| style="text-align:left;"|Phoenix
| 4 || 0 || 16.8 || .333 ||  || .500 || 1.0 || .5 || .3 || .3 || 5.3
|-
| style="text-align:left;"|1997
| style="text-align:left;"|Phoenix
| 4 || 4 || 9.0 || .400 ||  ||  || 1.8 || .0 || .0 || .0 || 3.0
|- class="sortbottom"
| style="text-align:center;" colspan="2"|Career
| 22 || 4 || 17.3 || .456 || .000 || .590 || 2.6 || 1.0 || .1 || .2 || 7.1

Music career

Tisdale launched his music career with his debut album Power Forward in 1995 on the Motown Label. Primarily a bass player, he recorded eight albums, with the 2001 release Face to Face climbing to No. 1 on Billboard's contemporary jazz chart. He was awarded the Legacy Tribute Award by the Oklahoma Jazz Hall of Fame in 2002. In an ESPN internet chat, Tisdale said his musical influences included the funk bands of the 1970s. His most recent release (and his final album before his death), Rebound, was written and released after he was diagnosed with cancer.

Cancer diagnosis
In March 2007, Tisdale underwent treatment for cancer in his knee (osteosarcoma), which was discovered after he fell down a flight of stairs at his home in Los Angeles on February 8, and broke his leg. In May, Tisdale announced on his website that he was recovering from a procedure to remove the cyst, and expected to recover 100%. He and Regina agreed not to tell their four children about his diagnosis until the fall of that year, when the entire family was together (their oldest daughter lives in Atlanta and their second-oldest was attending college at the time). However, the first round of chemotherapy was unsuccessful, leading to a second round. As Tisdale recalled later, "The doctor had never given anyone chemo that was my size. They just calculated how much chemo to give me and said, 'We hope it doesn't mess up your kidneys. If it does, sorry." 
He drew on some of the challenges he faced during his basketball career to battle the disease, specifically recalling, "I had some coaches that literally didn't want me to make it, and one in particular was Bobby Knight. At the time I frowned on that … I look at it today that had I not persevered through a lot of the stuff he put me through, I probably wouldn't be here today. I thank God for that dude because he pushed me."

In August 2008, Tisdale had part of his right leg amputated because of the bone cancer. On his web site, Tisdale said removing a portion of the leg would be the best way to ensure that the cancer would not return. In a video message at halftime of a September 28 Sooners' football game, Tisdale affirmed he was doing well and that he was at peace following the operation.

Shortly after the operation, he was fitted for a prosthesis. Scott Sabolich, the clinical director, said that in his 21-year career he had never created a prosthesis as large as the one he had to design for Tisdale. Sabolich noted that it typically takes a new amputee from three to six months to acclimate to a prosthesis, while it took Tisdale a month. He proved to be equally quick in learning to walk on his new limb; a physical therapist Tisdale worked with in Tulsa said that he was months ahead of a typical patient in that respect. Tisdale's experience led him to establish the Wayman Tisdale Foundation to raise funds to help amputees with the prosthetic process, which is not always covered by health insurance.

In April 2009, Tisdale accepted an award from the Greenwood Cultural Center in Tulsa, then set off on a 21-date national concert tour.

Death
Tisdale died on May 15, 2009, at St. John Medical Center in Tulsa, where his wife had taken him when he had trouble breathing. She later confirmed that he died after his esophagus ruptured following radiation treatments for his cancer. Tisdale's agent described his death as a "great shock" and noted that Tisdale had been planning to go into the recording studio the following week for a project with jazz guitarist Norman Brown.

On May 21, 2009, 4,000 mourners attended Tisdale's memorial service at the BOK Center in Tulsa. In June 2009, the University of Oklahoma-Tulsa announced that its new specialty health clinic in north Tulsa would be named in Tisdale's honor.

According to the liner notes, Toby Keith's 2009 album American Ride is "dedicated in memory of Wayman and Noel McFarland." The album includes the song "Cryin' for Me (Wayman's Song)," a tribute to Tisdale featuring Keith, Dave Koz, Marcus Miller, and Arthur Thompson. Keith had intended to play the song at Wayman's funeral but performed Willie Nelson's "Angel Flying Too Close to the Ground" instead because he wasn't emotionally ready to play "Cryin' for Me" (which opens with Wayman's outgoing voicemail message.)

According to a note in the album sleeve, the song "Bright" by guitarist Peter White (Good Day, 2009) was dedicated "to the memory of Wayman Tisdale, whose spirit never failed to brighten our lives." White said: "The guy was always so happy, so positive, always had a smile, always made you feel great. Even before his death, I'd always called this song 'Bright,' because it sounded uplifting and happy and funny. Then I realized that it would be the perfect song to dedicate to Wayman, because that was the way he came across to the world."

Discography
 Power Forward (Motown, 1995)
 In The Zone (Motown, 1996)
 Decisions (1998)
 Face to Face (2001)
 Presents 21 Days (2003)
 Hang Time (2004)
 Way Up! (2006)
 Rebound (2008)
 Fonk Record: Featuring Tiz & Fonkie Planetarians (2010)
 The Absolute Greatest Hits (2014)

See also
List of NCAA Division I men's basketball players with 60 or more points in a game
List of NCAA Division I men's basketball players with 2000 points and 1000 rebounds

External links
 at NBA.com (selected season stats, career highs)
 NBA statistics at databasebasketball.com
 The Wayman Tisdale Story documentary

References

1964 births
2009 deaths
20th-century American guitarists
African-American basketball players
African-American guitarists
All-American college men's basketball players
American amputees
American jazz bass guitarists
American male bass guitarists
American men's basketball players
American Protestants
Basketball players at the 1983 Pan American Games
Basketball players at the 1984 Summer Olympics
Basketball players from Oklahoma
Basketball players from Texas
Booker T. Washington High School (Tulsa, Oklahoma) alumni
Deaths from cancer in Oklahoma
Deaths from bone cancer
Guitarists from Los Angeles
Guitarists from Oklahoma
Indiana Pacers draft picks
Indiana Pacers players
American male jazz musicians
McDonald's High School All-Americans
Medalists at the 1984 Summer Olympics
Musicians from Tulsa, Oklahoma
National Collegiate Basketball Hall of Fame inductees
Oklahoma Sooners men's basketball players
Olympic gold medalists for the United States in basketball
Pan American Games gold medalists for the United States
Pan American Games medalists in basketball
Parade High School All-Americans (boys' basketball)
Phoenix Suns players
Power forwards (basketball)
Sacramento Kings players
Smooth jazz bass guitarists
Sportspeople from Fort Worth, Texas
Sportspeople from Tulsa, Oklahoma
United States men's national basketball team players
20th-century bass guitarists
20th-century American male musicians
Medalists at the 1983 Pan American Games
20th-century African-American sportspeople
21st-century African-American people